Spyros Kapernekas (10 August 1948 – 14 December 2021) was a Greek professional football player and coach.

Career
Kapernekas played for Acharnaikos, Olympiacos and Aris Thessaloniki. He won the 1970–71 Greek Cup with Olympiacos.

He later worked as a coach for the Aris amateur team.

Honours
Olympiacos
 Greek Cup: 1970–71

References

1948 births
2021 deaths
Greek footballers
Acharnaikos F.C. players
Olympiacos F.C. players
Aris Thessaloniki F.C. players
Aris Thessaloniki F.C. non-playing staff
Association football coaches
Association footballers not categorized by position
Footballers from Kalamata